Logie Green may refer to two adjacent stadiums:
New Logie Green, a football ground in Edinburgh in use between 1893 and 1899
Old Logie Green, a football ground in Edinburgh in use between 1904 and 1926